Rare Bird were an English progressive rock band, formed in 1969. They released five studio albums between 1969 and 1974. In the UK, the organ-based single track "Sympathy" reach number 27, selling an estimated one million globally.

Career 
The band's was formed in December 1969, it featured lead singer and guitarist Steve Gould, organist Graham Field, electric pianist David Kaffinetti and drummer Mark Ashton. The first album released in 1969 was called "Rare Bird". Along with Van der Graaf Generator and The Nice, they were one of the very first bands that signed to Charisma Records, the record label that Tony Stratton-Smith had founded.

History 
The history of Rare Bird began when Graham Field placed an advertisement for a pianist in a musical periodical. He got thirty replies and formed a group called "Lunch". He met Dave Kaffinetti in November 1968, and together they formulated the basic ideas for Rare Bird. In August 1969, they finally found the ideal rhythm section in Steve Gould, Chris Randall and Mark Ashton. Field and Kaffinetti had originally envisaged that the band would be a four-piece and were looking for a singer/bass player. Steve and Chris, who had both previously been members of the Pop-Psych band "Fruit Machine", applied to the ad as vocals/guitar and bass respectively and were taken on. Lunch played a few gigs, one notable one was at the Tilbury Working Mens Club for the princely sum of five pounds. The band had no van and they managed to get amps, drums, guitars and Hammond organ into their cars. The gig was marred by Chris receiving a bad electric shock whilst on stage. It later turned out that the founders of the band were more interested in Steve and convinced him to play bass. Chris was now high and dry and was kicked out of the band. Two weeks later, they had signed management and agency contracts, and three weeks later, were in the studio recording their debut album. Before joining Lunch, Randall and Gould had previously written a song called "To the Memory of Two Brave Dogs". Rare Bird included this song in their debut album renaming it "Iceberg" but Randall received no credit on the L.P.

"Sympathy" 
Their late 1969 release "Sympathy" reached No. 1 in Italy and in France, sold 500,000 copies in France and is estimated to have sold one million globally. It became their only UK hit single, reaching No. 27 and staying on the chart for 8 weeks.

Covers 
A 1970 cover version of Sympathy by The Family Dogg, reached number two in the Netherlands. 

In 1992 the song returned to the UK chart with a version by Marillion that reached No. 17.

In 2001, Sympathy was sampled by Faithless in their song "Not Enuff Love", named after a chorus line in "Sympathy". 

The song "Beautiful Scarlet" from their first album was sampled in the 2004 song "Summer's Gonna Hurt You" by electronic music producer/DJ Diplo.

Later releases and legacy 
In early 1971, Graham Field left Rare Bird to form a short-lived solo project, The Fields. Later members included Fred Kelly (Nic Potter), Ced Curtis, Paul Holland, and Paul Karas on the Epic Forest album with Andy Curtis and Fred Kelly appearing on the album Somebody's Watching.  

The band finally split up in 1975. Dave Kaffinetti (credited as David Kaff) played the part of Viv Savage in This Is Spinal Tap (1984). Chris Randall went on to play with Martin Murray and The Honeycombs, the group of the mid 1960s with their worldwide hits, "Have I the Right", "Love In Tokyo" and "Thats the Way!". 

Paul Holland  had previously been a recording engineer at Southern Music's studio in Denmark Street, London during the time that Fruit Machine recorded songs for release on the Spark Label under the direction of Barry Kingston. He died of cancer in 2010.

Discography

Studio albums
Rare Bird (UK: Charisma, U.S.: Command/Probe, 1969) U.S. # 115 (13 w)
As Your Mind Flies By (UK: Charisma, U.S.: ABC, 1970)
Epic Forest (Polydor, 1972) U.S. # 194 (2 w)
Somebody's Watching (Polydor, 1973)
Born Again (Polydor, 1974)

Singles
"Sympathy" b/w "Devils High Concern" (UK No. 27, 14 February 1970)/US No. 121, 11 March 1970 / F # 3)
"Roadside Welcome"/"Four Grey Walls" b/w "You're Lost" Uncharted UK Polydor 2814 011 (1972)
"Birdman -Part One" (Title No. 1 Again) US No. 122, 1 September 1973)

Compilation albums
Attention! Rare Bird (1972 Fontana cat. # 9299 008)
Rare Bird (Polydor cat. # 2384 078, a budget re-release, compiling tracks from their three albums on Polydor; released in the Polydor Special series in 1977)
Sympathy (Blue Plate, (1976))
Third Time Around: An Introduction to Rare Bird (Universal, 2003)

References

English progressive rock groups
Musical groups established in 1969
Charisma Records artists